Aleš Loprais (born 10 January 1980 in Olomouc) is a Czech rally raid truck driver. Loprais has a long association with Tatra and has been a frequent participant of the Dakar Rally, having also won the 2011 Silk Way Rally in the truck category.

Career
Loprais is nephew of the highly successful Czech rally raid truck driver Karel Loprais. The younger Loprais first competed on the Dakar Rally in 2006 as navigator to his uncle Karel, and from 2007 he has competed as a driver for Tatra. Loprais has scored several stage victories in the Dakar Rally, his best overall result being third place in 2007. Apart from the Dakar Rally, Loprais competed in a number of other rally raid races, including the Silk Way Rally and the 2008 Central Europe Rally.

In 2023, he was placed under police investigation after accidentally killing a spectator while competing in the Dakar Rally.

Dakar Rally results

 Co-driver for Karel Loprais

Silk Way Rally results

References 

1980 births
Sportspeople from Olomouc
Czech rally drivers
Off-road racing drivers
Living people
Dakar Rally drivers
Rally raid truck drivers